The USCGC Blackhaw (WLB-390) was a  belonging to the United States Coast Guard launched on 18 June 1943 and commissioned on 17 February 1944.

Design
The Iris-class buoy tenders were constructed after the Mesquite-class buoy tenders. She was powered by one electric motor. This was connected up to two Westinghouse generators which were driven by two CooperBessemer GND-8 four-cycle diesel engines. She had a single screw.

The ships had a complement of six officers and seventy-four crew members in 1945; this decreased to two warrants, four officers, and forty-seven men in 1966. They were fitted with a SL1 radar system and QBE-3A sonar system in 1945. Their armament consisted of one 3"/50 caliber gun, two 20 mm/80 guns, two Mousetraps, two depth charge tracks, and four Y-guns in 1945; these were removed in 1966.

Career 

For March and April 1944 
Blackhaw was assigned to general aid to navigation (ATON) and icebreaking duties on the Great Lakes. Afterward she was assigned to the 6th Coast Guard District and homeported in Charleston, South Carolina, where she was used for general ATON duties.
After the war, until 1 August 1954, Blackhaw continued to be stationed at Charleston, and used for ATON. The two cutters escorted the tanker to Jacksonville, Florida. From 7-9 September 1952, Blackhaw searched for survivors from MV Foundation Star. Two months later, 19-20 November 1952, the cutter discovered and recovered wreck of an F8F-2 aircraft. On 29 October 1953, the crew assisted vessel T N. Gill off Charleston. On 1 August 1954, the cutter was transferred to the Pacific and homeported at Honolulu, Hawaii, until 1967. She was used for ATON throughout the Pacific including American Samoa , the Marshalls , the Marianas, the Carolines, and the Philippines. On 11 October 1954 the cutter helped medevac a sailor from USS Kearsarge off Honolulu. 

From June to August 1957 
Blackhaw operated off Alaska on Special Arctic Operation, including ice breaking. From 9-14 November 1957, she searched for Pan American Flight 944 off Hawaii. On 24 December 1957 the ship assisted FV Hawaiian Fisherman off Kahului, Hawaii and later, on 15 October 1958, did likewise for FV Flying Fish Victor 3. Following a fire onboard MV Nicoline Maersk, Blackhaw responded and escorted the vessel to Honolulu, HI from 23-24 November 1958. On 18 July 1959 Blackhaw relieved USCGC 
Dexter of tow of FV Cloud Nine and proceeded to Hawaii.

From 1967 to 1971 

Blackhaw was stationed at Sangley Point, Philippines and used to service ATON. From March 1968 through May 1971 performed numerous tours in Vietnamese waters servicing ATON. After returning from Vietnam the cutter was reassigned to San Francisco from 1971-90, docked at Yerba Buena Island, and used for ATON. During July 1983 the crew replaced the destroyed Blunts Reef Large Navigational Beacon with a new Exposed Location Buoy. During the spring of 1989 the ship and its crew were used in the movie The Hunt for Red October to depict a Soviet icebreaker and its crew.

The cutter was decommissioned at Curtis Bay, MD on 26 February 1993 and her crew was cross-decked to USCGC Buttonwood which was commissioned that same day.

In popular culture 
During the spring of 1989, the ship and her crew were used during the filming of The Hunt for Red October to depict a Soviet icebreaker and its crew.

See also
 List of United States Coast Guard cutters

Gallery

References

External links

Iris-class seagoing buoy tenders
1943 ships
Ships built in Duluth, Minnesota
Historic American Engineering Record in San Francisco